Herbaspirillum autotrophicum is a bacterium which cannot fix nitrogen under laboratory conditions, like Herbaspirillum seropedicae, because it does not have the Nif gene.

References

External links
Type strain of Herbaspirillum autotrophicum at BacDive -  the Bacterial Diversity Metadatabase

Burkholderiales